An ink trap is a feature of certain typefaces designed for printing in small sizes. At an ink trap, the corners or details are removed from the letterforms. When the type is printed, ink naturally spreads into the removed area. Without ink traps, the excess ink would soak outwards and ruin the crisp edge.

Ink traps are only needed for small point sizes and are usually only found on typefaces designed for printing on newsprint. Fonts of this kind are applicable for classifieds or telephone books. Typefaces with ink traps may be offered in versions without them for display on screen or at larger sizes.

Typefaces featuring ink traps include Retina, Bell Centennial, and Tang.

References

Typography